Blanka Škodová (born 1 October 1997) is a Czech ice hockey goaltender and member of the Czech national team, currently playing with the Minnesota Duluth Bulldogs women's ice hockey program in the Western Collegiate Hockey Association (WCHA) conference of the conference of the NCAA Division I.

Škodová represented the Czech Republic at the IIHF Women's World Championships in 2016 and 2017, at the Division I Group A tournament in 2015. As a junior player with the Czech national under-18 team, she participated in the 2015 IIHF Women's U18 World Championships, at which she was selected as a top three player on the Czech team by the coaches.

References

External links
 

Living people
1997 births
Czech expatriate ice hockey people
Czech expatriate ice hockey players in the United States
Czech women's ice hockey goaltenders
Minnesota Duluth Bulldogs women's ice hockey players
People from Šternberk
Sportspeople from the Olomouc Region
Vermont Academy alumni
Vermont Catamounts women's ice hockey players